Yu Zhengxie (1775–1840) was a Qing Dynasty scholar from Yi county in modern-day Anhui province. Along with his philological work, he was a noted critic of foot binding, female infanticide, and the cult of widow chastity.

Biography

Yu Zhongxie was born in Yi county, but he grew up in Jurong, Jiangsu, where his father Yu Xian (1750–1801) served as sub-director of schools from 1778 to 1794. In 1821, he was a successful candidate in the imperial provincial examination, obtaining the rank of juren. Despite his wide learning and exceptional memory, he was unsuccessful in the metropolitan examination of 1833. 

For his stance on women's issues, Lin Yutang regarded him as one of the three pre-modern Chinese male feminists along with Yuan Mei and Li Ruzhen. A skilled philologist, Yu researched the history of language, which influenced his views on women. According to his interpretation, Chinese historical texts supported an egalitarian view of marriage. He also wrote about the island of Taiwan, religion in Tibet, and the relationship between Tibet and the Manchus.

Further reading
Brownell, Susan and Wasserstrom, Jeffrey N. (2002). Chinese Femininities/Chinese Masculinities: A Reader. University of California Press. 
Ko, Dorothy (1995) Teachers of the Inner Chambers: Women and Culture in Seventeenth-Century China. Stanford University Press.  
Zhengxie, Yu. (1833). "Jealousy is not a wicked behavior for a woman". Shanghai:Shangwu, reprint.

References

Male feminists
Chinese feminists
19th-century Chinese philosophers
Qing dynasty essayists
1775 births
1840 deaths
Philosophers from Anhui
People from Huangshan